The Associated Press College Basketball Player of the Year award was established in 1961 to recognize the best men's college basketball player of the year, as voted upon by the Associated Press (AP).

The only three-time winner is Ralph Sampson of the Virginia Cavaliers program. Lew Alcindor, Jerry Lucas, David Thompson, and Bill Walton each won the award twice.

Key

Winners by school

Footnotes
 Lew Alcindor changed his name to Kareem Abdul-Jabbar in 1971 after converting to Islam.

See also
List of U.S. men's college basketball national player of the year awards
Associated Press College Basketball Coach of the Year
Associated Press Women's College Basketball Player of the Year

References

External links
AP Player of the Year

Associated Press awards
Awards established in 1961
College basketball player of the year awards in the United States